The Wedgling Moth (Galgula partita) is a moth of the family Noctuidae. It is found from most of North America south to Guatemala and the Caribbean. It is also present on the Azores, Madeira and the Canary Islands.

The wingspan is 20–26 mm. Adult males have reddish-brown to grayish forewings, while these are shiny dark brownish-maroon to blackish in females. The hindwings are grayish-brown, but darker in females than in males. They are on wing from March to November in the southern part of the range and from May to September in the north. There are several generations per year.

The larvae feed on Oxalis species.

References

External links

Hadeninae
Moths described in 1852
Moths of Europe
Moths of Central America
Moths of North America
Taxa named by Achille Guenée